Hasanabad-e Sofla (also Romanized as Ḩasanābād-e Soflá) is a village in Dinavar Rural District, Dinavar District, Sahneh County, Kermanshah Province, Iran. At the 2006 census, its population was 190, in 43 families.

References 

Populated places in Sahneh County